Tafiré is a town in northern Ivory Coast. It is a sub-prefecture and commune of Niakaramandougou Department in Hambol Region, Vallée du Bandama District.

Villages
The 8 villages of the sub-prefecture of Tafiré and their population in 2014 are
 Koulokakaha (153)
 N'golodougou (1 828)
 Tafiré (17 191)
 Tiélétanakaha (187)
 Korlokaha (533)
 Ségbélékaha (94)
 Sélilékaha (2 123)
 Takpalakaha (1 256)

Notes

In 2014, the population of the sub-prefecture of Tafiré was 23,365.

Sub-prefectures of Hambol
Communes of Hambol